On October 22, 1988, an integrist Catholic group set fire to the Saint Michel cinema in Paris while it was showing the film The Last Temptation of Christ. A little after midnight, an incendiary device ignited under a seat in the less supervised underground room, where a different film was being shown. The incendiary device consisted of a charge of potassium chlorate, triggered by a vial containing sulphuric acid.

The attack injured thirteen people, four of whom were severely burned. The Saint Michel cinema was heavily damaged, and reopened three years later after restoration. The Archbishop of Paris, Jean-Marie Lustiger, had previously condemned the film without having seen it, but also condemned the attack, calling the perpetrators "enemies of Christ".

The attack was subsequently blamed on a Christian fundamentalist group linked to Bernard Antony, a representative of the far-right Front National (NF) to the European Parliament in Strasbourg, and the excommunicated followers of Archbishop Marcel Lefebvre. Similar attacks against cinemas included graffiti, setting off tear-gas canisters and stink bombs, and assaulting filmgoers. At least nine people believed to be members of the Christian fundamentalist group were arrested. Five militants of a group called "General Alliance Against Racism and for Respect of the French and Christian Identity" (Alliance générale contre le racisme et pour le respect de l'identité française et chrétienne) were given suspended prison sentences of between 15 and 36 months, as well as a 450,000 franc fine for damages.

Rene Remond, a historian, said of the Christian far-right, "It is the toughest component of the National Front and it is motivated more by religion than by politics. It has a coherent political philosophy that has not changed for 200 years: it is the rejection of the revolution, of the republic and of modernism."

References

See also 
 Besançon courthouse attack
 January 2015 Île-de-France attacks

1988 crimes in France
1988 fires in Europe
1988 in Christianity
1988 in film
Film controversies in France
Religious controversies in France
Attacks on cinemas
October 1988 events in Europe
Arson in France
Christian fundamentalism
French Integralism
Christian terrorism in Europe
Right-wing terrorist incidents
Terrorist incidents in France in 1988